Ypsilonigaster is a genus of braconid wasps in the family Braconidae. There are about six described species in Ypsilonigaster, found in Africa and Indomalaya.

Species
These six species belong to the genus Ypsilonigaster:
 Ypsilonigaster bumbana (de Saeger, 1942) (Congo)
 Ypsilonigaster naturalis Fernandez-Triana & Boudreault, 2018 ( Malaysia)
 Ypsilonigaster pteroloba (de Saeger, 1944) (Congo)
 Ypsilonigaster sharkeyi Fernandez-Triana & Boudreault, 2018 (Congo)
 Ypsilonigaster tiger Fernandez-Triana & Boudreault, 2018 (Thailand)
 Ypsilonigaster zuparkoi Fernandez-Triana & Boudreault, 2018 (Madagascar)

References

Microgastrinae